MDL Information Systems, Inc. was a provider of R&D informatics products for the life sciences and chemicals industries. The company was launched as a computer-aided drug design firm (originally named Molecular Design Limited, Inc.) in January 1978 in Hayward, California. The company was acquired by Symyx Technologies, Inc. in 2007. Subsequently Accelrys merged with Symyx. The Accelrys name was retained for the combined company. In 2014 Accelrys was acquired by Dassault Systemes. The Accelrys business unit was renamed BIOVIA.

History
Molecular Design Limited, Inc. was founded by Stuart Marson and W. Todd Wipke in 1978.

With 15 years of research on computer synthesis at the University of California, Santa Cruz, Wipke, with Marson, fresh from a Ph.D. at Stanford University and a postdoctoral stint at the University of California, Berkeley, were convinced that computer-assisted molecular design was possible as a commercial enterprise.  Employee #3 was Stephen Peacock, a colleague of Marson, and #4 was Jim Dill, a graduate student from Princeton, as was #5, Doug Hounshell, also a graduate of Princeton.

MDL was the first company to provide an interactive graphical registry and full and substructural retrieval.  The company's initial products were first-of-their-kind systems for storing and retrieving molecules as graphical structures and for managing databases of chemical reactions and related data. These systems revolutionized the way scientists accessed and managed chemical information in the 1980s.

From its initial pioneering of computer handling of graphical chemical structures with MACCS (Molecular ACCess System) in 1979, MDL continued at the forefront of the field now known as cheminformatics.

In 1985, MDL moved its corporate headquarters from Hayward to a larger campus in San Leandro, CA. In 1987, MDL was purchased by Maxwell Communications Corporation.

In 1993, the company was publicly offered as MDL Information Systems, Inc. (MDLI) on the NASDAQ stock exchange. In 1997, the company was purchased by Reed Elsevier, the Anglo-Dutch publisher and information provider, becoming a wholly owned subsidiary of Elsevier, a publisher of scientific, technical and medical information. In February 2006, Elsevier MDL moved its corporate headquarters from San Leandro to San Ramon, CA.

In October 2007, Elsevier MDL was acquired by Symyx Technologies, Inc., an R&D productivity company offering software, modular workflow tools and research services to global enterprises in the life sciences, chemicals, energy and consumer products industries. MDL was merged with Symyx Software, and the new combined organization is based in San Ramon, CA. The infrastructure-related software applications and databases of MDL, including CrossFire Beilstein, CrossFire Gmelin, the Patent Chemistry Database, xPharm and PharmaPendium — were retained by Elsevier and integrated within Elsevier's Science & Technology operations.

The August 2007 press release announcing Symyx Technologies' acquisition of MDL indicates that combining Symyx and MDL offerings creates an expanded set of software solutions and services to enhance R&D productivity in the life sciences, chemicals and energy industries. The press release states: "With this solution set, Symyx will be able to accelerate its customers' move toward paperless labs by integrating content, collaborative desktops, automation and information management for users, workgroups and the enterprise."

Innovations

 Commercial system for interactive molecular modeling (PRXBLD, 1979)
 Commercial system for computer handling of chemical reactions (REACCS, 1982)
 Commercial system integrating chemical structures with data (MACCS-II, 1984)
 PC-based chemistry database system, the Chemist's Personal Software Series (CPSS: ChemBase, ChemTalk/ChemHost, 1985)
 Commercial system integrating chemistry drawing and word processing (ChemText, 1986)
 Commercial 3D structure database (MACCS-3D, 1988)
 Commercial system for storing structures of mixtures and formulations (MACCS-II Substance Module, 1989)
 Commercial client-server system for managing chemical and biological information (MDL ISIS, 1991)
 Commercial system for structure-based handling of generic structures (MDL Central Library, 1996)
 Searchable, "live" chemical structures and spectra (JCAMP-DX format) in Web pages (MDL Chime plug-in, MDL Chemscape server, 1996/1997)
 Commercial system dynamically linking citations to electronic journal articles and patents (MDL LitLink, 1999)
 Web-based commercial system indexing multiple structure databases and linking to synthetic methodology databases and major reference works (DiscoveryGate, 2002)
 Software application for predicting potential carcinogenic risk of compounds based on their structures ([MDL Carcinogenicity Module, 2003)
 Complete, open, flexible and scalable n-tier informatics system supporting enterprise-wide business process, data and application integration for the life sciences (MDL Isentris, 2004)
 Advanced structure drawing with All-Purpose Drawing Tool and custom template toolbars, MDL Draw, 2004)
 Structure-searchable patent chemistry information (Patent Chemistry Database, 2004) and online pharmacological information (xPharm, 2004)
 Key laboratory workflow applications (MDL Logistics reagent management application and MDL Notebook electronic laboratory notebook, 2005)
 Isentris-based application for building and managing compound registries (MDL Registration, 2006)
 First electronically searchable FDA Drug Approval Packages (PharmaPendium, 2006)
 Out-of-the-box Reaction Planner for exploring precursor steps, integration of proprietary and commercial data (Isentris 2.0 and 3.0, 2007).

See also
 Computational chemistry
 Drug development
 Drug discovery
 Drug discovery hit to lead
 Bioinformatics
 Pre-clinical development
 Compound management

References

External links
 Molecular Connection 25th Anniversary

Chemical companies of the United States
Companies based in Hayward, California
1978 establishments in California